Day Island is an island at the mouth of the Petaluma River in San Pablo Bay (an embayment of San Francisco Bay). It is part of Marin County, California. It appears on a 1951 USGS map of the area, although it appears on maps from as old as 1873. The "1880 History of Marin County" by Alley, Bowen and Co. mentions "a man by name of Day" who "settled on an island in Novato township which has since borne his name" in 1851." To this day, there are still 2 houses on the island, both inhabited. The island is bordered by dirt and two lagoons to the west, and marshlands to the east, although it was once entirely surrounded by either marshland or water.

References

Islands of Marin County, California
Islands of Northern California
San Pablo Bay
Petaluma River